The Jafr alien invasion was a prank published on the front page of the Jordanian newspaper Al-Ghad on April 1, 2010. The article claimed that UFOs had landed in a desert close to the town of Jafr, and described the pilots of the objects as "3m (10ft) creatures". The newspaper reported that all communications "went down" due to the effect generated by the objects.

The story described in great detail that the town had been lit by the aliens' flying saucers during their night landing, and that the light caused residents to run out into the streets. After word of the article spread throughout Jafr, many residents were terrified and kept their children home from school. Jafr Mayor Mohammed Mleihan notified security authorities and prepared to issue an evacuation order for the entire town of 13,000 residents. Mleihan noted that residents were "scared that aliens would attack them" and considered suing the newspaper for their "big lie". 

The newspaper formally apologised for the inconvenience the stunt had caused. The newspaper's editor did not specify why Jafr was chosen as the butt of the joke, but BBC coverage noted that the area was "notorious" for its military bases that were used by American soldiers during joint military exercises with the Jordanian military, and which once housed alleged al-Qaida militants. 

The prank drew comparison to the 1938 radio broadcast of War of the Worlds which provoked panic in the United States. Although April Fool's Day jokes in newspapers are a common tradition in some countries, this is not the case in Jordan.

References

External links
رصد كائنات ضخمة يبلغ طولها 3 أمتار وتتكلم لغة غير معروفة

April Fools' Day
Journalistic hoaxes
UFO sightings
UFO hoaxes
2010 in Jordan
2010 hoaxes
Ma'an Governorate